The Costa Rica women's national volleyball team represents Costa Rica in international women's volleyball competitions and friendly matches.

At the Women's NORCECA Volleyball Championship, Costa Rica usually competes for places 5-8. In 2013, then head coach Horacio Bastit stated that a better finish was not yet realistic. He stated that beating teams such as the US, Canada, Puerto Rico or the Dominican Republic can remain as goals for the future.

Results

FIVB Volleyball Women's World Championship
 2010 — 17th place

NORCECA Championship
1999 — 7th place
2001 — 5th place
2003 — 6th place
2005 — Did not participate
2007 — 7th place
2009 — 7th place
2011 — 8th place
2013 — 8th place
2015 — 8th place
2017 — 7th place
2019 — TBA

Pan-American Cup
2009 — 8th place
2010 — 11th place
2011 — 11th place
2012 — 9th place
2013 — 11th place
2014 — 10th place
2015 — 11th place
2016 — 12th place
2017 — Did not participate
2018 — 12th place
2019 — Did not participate
2021 — Did not participate
2022 — 8th place

2009 Pan-American Cup Roster
Head Coach: Braulio Godínez

References

External links
NORCECA
FIVB

Volleyball
National women's volleyball teams
Women's sport in Costa Rica
Volleyball in Costa Rica